The Paceship 23 is a Canadian sailboat, that was designed by Cuthbertson & Cassian and first built in 1969.

Production
The boat was built by Paceship Yachts in Mahone Bay, Nova Scotia, Canada between 1969 and 1978, but it is now out of production. A total of 240 examples were constructed during its nine-year production run.

Design

The Paceship 23 is a small recreational keelboat, built predominantly of fiberglass, with wood trim, including a full length wooden rub rail. It has a masthead sloop rig, a transom-hung rudder and a fixed fin keel. It displaces  and carries  of ballast.

The boat is normally fitted with a small outboard motor for docking and maneuvering.

Operational history
The boat was at one time supported by an active class club, The Paceship, but the club is currently inactive.

See also
List of sailing boat types

Similar sailboats
Beneteau First 235
Bluenose one-design sloop
Hunter 23
O'Day 23
Paceship PY 23
Precision 23
Rob Roy 23
Schock 23
Sonic 23
Stone Horse
Watkins 23

References

External links

Keelboats
1960s sailboat type designs
Sailing yachts
Sailboat type designs by C&C Design
Sailboat types built by Paceship Yachts